Black Lamb and Grey Falcon: A Journey Through Yugoslavia is a travel book written by Dame Rebecca West, published in 1941 in two volumes by Macmillan in the UK and by The Viking Press in the US.

The book is over 1,100 pages in modern editions and gives an account of Balkan history and ethnography during West's six-week trip to Yugoslavia in 1937. West's objective was "to show the past side by side with the present it created". Publication of the book coincided with the Nazi Invasion of Yugoslavia, and West added a foreword highly praising the Yugoslavs for their brave defiance of Germany. The book's epigraph reads: "To my friends in Yugoslavia, who are now all dead or enslaved".

The character of "Constantine" is supposedly based on Stanislav Vinaver. Anica Savić Rebac, under the name of Milica, appears not only as a new friend, but also as the intellectual guide who eventually reveals to Rebecca West the rituals which would lead the author to the title metaphor of her vision of the Balkans.

Plot summary
The book details the six-week journey West made, with her husband, to Yugoslavia in 1937. During the trip, West and her husband travelled to Croatia, Dalmatia, Herzegovina, Bosnia, Serbia, Macedonia and Montenegro.

Legacy
It made the Random House Modern Library list of the best 100 non-fiction books of the 20th century.

American writer Larry McMurtry says in an essay that "there are only a few great travel books. Rebecca West's Black Lamb and Grey Falcon is one."

American writer Brian Hall says in his book, The Impossible Country that "after four years of writing...and 1,100 densely packed pages...she succeeded only in representing the Serb viewpoint."

Sources
 West, Rebecca, intr. Geoff Dyer, (2006). Black Lamb and Grey Falcon: A Journey Through Yugoslavia. Edinburgh.

References

Further reading

External links
 Review from enotes.co
 Online text of the book from the Atlantic Monthly online

Black Lamb and Grey Falcon
Black Lamb and Grey Falcon
Books about Yugoslavia
1937 in Yugoslavia